The Minnesota Indian Affairs Council (MIAC) is a state-level government agency created by the Minnesota Legislature in 1963 to provide a liaison between the government of Minnesota and the American Indian tribes in the state. The council also brings issues of concern to Indians living in urban areas to the attention of the state government. It was the first state-level Indian affairs agency to be established in the United States.

Mission and vision 
The mission of MIAC is "to protect the sovereignty of the 11 Minnesota tribes and ensure the well-being of all American Indian citizens throughout the state of Minnesota." The organization's vision, as given in a 2020 report by Wilder Research, is "to strive for social, economic, and political justice for all American Indian people living in Minnesota, while embracing our traditional cultural and spiritual values."

Tribal nations 
The council communicates with governments of eleven Indian reservations recognized by the United States federal government. Seven are Anishinaabe (Chippewa, Ojibwe) reservations and four are Dakota (Sioux) communities, listed below:

 Bois Forte Indian Reservation (Zagaakwaandagowininiwag) 
 Fond du Lac Indian Reservation (Nah-gah-chi-wa-nong)
 Grand Portage Indian Reservation (Gichi-Onigaming)
 Leech Lake Indian Reservation (Gaa-zagaskwaabiganikaag)
 Lower Sioux Indian Reservation (Cansa'yapi)
 Mille Lacs Indian Reservation (Misi-zaaga'iganiing)
 Prairie Island Indian Community (Tinta Winta)
 Red Lake Indian Reservation (Mis-Qua-Mi-Saga-Eh-Ganing)
 Shakopee Mdewakanton Sioux Community (Medwakanton)
 Upper Sioux Indian Reservation (Pezihutazizi Oyate)
 White Earth Indian Reservation (Gaa-waabaabiganikaag)

The Ho-chunk Nation and the Minnesota Chippewa Tribe are absent, though the six component members of the Minnesota Chippewa Tribe have been included in MIAC.

References

External links
Official website

Native American organizations
Indian Affairs Council
Native American history of Minnesota
Native Americans in Minnesota